Oinacu is a commune located in Giurgiu County, Muntenia, Romania. This commune is composed of three villages: Braniștea, Comasca and Oinacu.

Comasca was part of Braniștea from 1968 to 2006.

References

Communes in Giurgiu County
Localities in Muntenia